Ermenonville is a commune in the Oise department, northern France. Ermenonville is notable for its park named for Jean-Jacques Rousseau by René Louis de Girardin. Rousseau's tomb was designed by the painter Hubert Robert, and sits on the Isle of Poplars in its lake.

History
In 1974 Turkish Airlines Flight 981 crashed in the Ermenonville Forest in Fontaine-Chaalis, Oise, near Ermenonville.

Three town councilors died on 1 June 2009 when Air France Flight 447 crashed into the Atlantic.

Park

The garden at Ermenonville was one of the earliest and finest examples of the French landscape garden. The garden at Ermenonville was planned beginning in 1762 by Marquis René Louis de Girardin, the friend and final patron of Jean-Jacques Rousseau. Girardin's master plan drew its inspiration from Rousseau's novels and philosophy of the nobility of Nature. Rousseau's tomb is prominently situated on the artificial island in Ermenonville's lake. It is remarked that Hubert Robert was the architect. Completed by 1778 with care and craft, the garden came to resemble a natural environment, almost a wilderness, appearing untouched by any human intervention. An imitation of Rousseau's island is at Dessau-Wörlitz Garden Realm, Germany.

During the early nineteenth century it was much visited and admired. The garden at Ermenonville was described by Girardin's son in 1811 in an elegant tour-book with aquatint plates that reveal Girardin's love of diverse vistas that capture painterly landscape effects. Enhancing the elegiac mood of these views were the altars and monuments, the 'Rustic Temple', and other details meant to evoke Rousseau's Julie, ou la nouvelle Héloïse.

Nearby is Rousseau's 'cabin' in the secluded désert of Ermenonville.

Napoleon Bonaparte visited Ermenonville, where he remarked to Girardin that it might have been better for the French peace if neither he nor Rousseau had ever been born. Girardin retold this story again and again after the fact.

Population
Ermenonville has a population of 1,007. Its proximity to Charles de Gaulle Airport causes it to have the highest-density of Air France employees among French communes.

See also
 Communes of the Oise department

References

External links
 
  
 Château d'Ermenonville website 
 Ermenonville, Parc Jean-Jacques Rousseau - a Gardens Guide review

Communes of Oise